Kirsten Price may refer to:
Kirsten Price (actress) (born 1981), American model and adult film actress.
Kirsten Price (musician), English-American musician.